Hourglass Remixes is a remix album by Depeche Mode's singer Dave Gahan. It was released by Mute Records on March 11, 2008 in North America.

Track listing
Vinyl album
 "Deeper & Deeper" (Juan Maclean Club mix)
 "Kingdom" (Booka Shade Club remix)
 "Love Will Leave" (Kap10Kurt mix)
 "Use You" (Maps remix)
 "Deeper & Deeper" (T. Raumschmiere remix extended)
 "Kingdom" (Digitalism remix)
 "Saw Something" (Onur Ozer)
 "Deeper & Deeper" (Sebastien Leger remix)

Bonus CD
 "Deeper & Deeper" (Juan Maclean Club mix)
 "Kingdom" (Booka Shade Club remix)
 "Love Will Leave" (Kap10Kurt mix)
 "Use You" (Maps remix)
 "Deeper & Deeper" (T. Raumschmiere remix extended)
 "Kingdom" (Digitalism remix)
 "Saw Something" (Onur Ozer)
 "Deeper & Deeper" (Sebastien Leger remix)
 "Kingdom" (Rosario's Big Room vocal)
 "Saw Something" (Skreamix)
 "Deeper & Deeper" (SHRUBBN!! FX instrumental)

References

External links
www.davegahan.com – official website

Dave Gahan albums
2008 remix albums
Mute Records remix albums
Virgin Records remix albums

es:Hourglass#Hourglass Remixes